Sarash (Uyghur: ساراش) came from the word Sayrash (in Uyghur: سايراش). The meaning of Sarash in English is translated to: 1) To sing, call (of birds); 2) to prattle on; to chatter; to gabble; to talk on and on. Sarash is a nickname given by a group of people to a person who is always complaining about unfair rules of government, bad society, unjust treatment to ones-self by group of people, and mostly to the person who is speaking against the government in Kashgar, and other parts of the Uyghuria. Sarash is using as a family name by some Uyghurs now. 

Sarash (also Romanized as Sarāsh) is a village in Layl Rural District, in the Central District of Lahijan County, Gilan Province, Iran. At the 2006 census, its population was 138, in 30 families.

References 

Populated places in Lahijan County